Metal carbon dioxide complexes are coordination complexes that contain carbon dioxide ligands. Aside from the fundamental interest in the coordination chemistry of simple molecules, studies in this field are motivated by the possibility that transition metals might catalyze useful transformations of CO2. This research is relevant both to organic synthesis and to the production of "solar fuels" that would avoid the use of petroleum-based fuels.

Structural trends

Carbon dioxide binds to metals in only a few ways. The bonding mode depends on the electrophilicity and basicity of the metal centre. Most common is the η2-CO2 coordination mode as illustrated by Aresta's complex, Ni(CO2)(PCy3)2, which was the first reported complex of CO2. This square-planar compound is a derivative of Ni(II) with a reduced CO2 ligand. In rare cases, CO2 binds to metals as a Lewis base through its oxygen centres, but such adducts are weak and mainly of theoretical interest. A variety of multinuclear complexes are also known often involving Lewis basic and Lewis acidic metals, e.g. metallacarboxylate salts (C5H5)Fe(CO)2CO2−K+. In multinuclear cases (compounds containing more than one metal), more complicated and more varied coordination geometries are observed. One example is the unsymmetrical compound containing four rhenium centres, [(CO)5ReCO2Re(CO)4]2. Carbon dioxide can also bind to ligands on a metal complex (vs just the metal), e.g. by converting hydroxy ligands to carbonato ligands.

Reactions
Transition metal carbon dioxide complexes undergo a variety of reactions. Metallacarboxylic acids protonate at oxygen and eventually convert to metal carbonyl complexes:
[LnMCO2]− + 2 H+ → [LnMCO]+ + H2O
This reaction is relevant to the potential catalytic conversion of CO2 to fuels.

Carbonation of metal-carbon bonds

Insertion into Cu-C bonds
N-heterocyclic carbene (NHC) supported CuI complexes catalyze carboxylation of organoboronic esters. The catalyst forms in situ from CuCl, an NHC ligand, and KOtBu. Copper tert-butoxide can transmetallate with the organoboronic ester to generate the CuI-C bond, which intermediate can insert into CO2 smoothly to get the respective carboxylate. Salt metathesis with KOtBu releases product and regenerates catalyst (Scheme 2).
 Apart from transmetallation, there are other approaches forming Cu-C bond. C-H functionalization is a straightforward and atom economic method. Base can help deprotonate acidic C-H protons and form Cu-C bond. [(Phenanthroline)Cu(PR3)] catalyst effect C-H carboxylation on terminal alkynes together with Cs2CO3. NHC-Cu-H species to deprotonate acidic proton to effect carboxylation of terminal alkynes. Cu-H species were generated from Cu-F and organosilanes. The carboxylate product was trapped by silyl fluoride to get silyl ether. For non-acidic C-H bonds, directed metalation with iBu3Al(TMP)Li is adopted followed by transmetallation with copper to get Cu-C bond. Allylic C-H bonds and phenyl C-H bonds got carboxylated with this approach by Hou and co-workers:

 Carbometallation to alkynes and allenes using organozinc and organoaluminum reagents followed by transmetallation to copper is also a strategy to initiate carboxylation. Trimethylaluminium is able to insert into unbiased aliphatic internal alkynes with syn fashion directed by ether directing group. Vinyl copper complexes are formed by transmetallation and carboxylation is realized with a similar pathway giving tetrasubstituted aliphatic vinyl carboxylic acids. In this case, regioslectivity is controlled by the favor of six-membered aluminum ring formation. Furthermore, carboxylation can be achieved on ynamides and allenamides using less reactive dimethyl zinc via similar approach.

Insertion in Pd-C bonds
In the presence of palladium acetate under 1-30 bar of CO2, simple aromatic compounds convert to aromatic carboxylic acids. A PSiP-pincer ligand (5) promotes carboxylation of allene without using pre-functionalized substrates. Catalyst regeneration, Et3Al was added to do transmetallation with palladium. Catalyst is regenerated by the following β-H elimination. Apart from terminal allenes, some of internal allenes are also tolerated in this reaction, generating allyl carboxylic acid with the yield between 54% and 95%. This system was also applied to 1,3-diene, generating carboxylic acid in 1,2 addition fashion. In 2015, Iwasawa et al. reported the germanium analogue (6) and combined CO2 source together with hydride source to formate salts.

 Palladium has shown huge power to catalyze C-H functionalization. If the Pd-C intermediate in carboxylation reaction comes from C-H activation, such methodology must promote metal catalyzed carboxylation to a much higher level in utility. Iwasawa and co-workers reported direct carboxylation by styrenyl C-H activation generating coumarin derivatives. Benzene rings with different electronic properties and some heteroaromatic rings are tolerated in this reaction with yield from 50% to 90%. C-H activation was demonstrated by crystallography study.

Insertion by Rh-C bonds
Similar to Cu(I) chemistry mentioned above, Rh(I) complexes can also transmetallate with arylboronic esters to get aryl rhodium intermediates, to which CO2 is inserted giving carboxylic acids. Later, Iwasawa et al. described C-H carboxylation strategy. Rh(I) undergoes oxidative addition to aryl C-H bond followed by transmetallation with alkyl aluminum species. Ar-Rh(I) regenerates by reductive elimination releasing methane. Ar-Rh(I) attacks CO2 then transmetallates with aryl boronic acid to release the boronic acid of product, giving final carboxylic acid by hydrolysis. Directed and non-directed versions are both achieved.

Iwasawa and co-workers developed Rh(I) catalyzed carbonation reaction initiated by Rh-H insertion to vinylarenes. In order to regenerate reactive Rh-H after nucleophilic addition to CO2, photocatalytic proton-coupled electron transfer approach was adopted. In this system, excess amount of diethylpropylethylamine works as sacrificial electron donor (Scheme 5).

Insertion by Ni-C bond
Carboxylation of benzyl halides has been reported. The reaction mechanism is proposed to involve oxidative addition of benzyl chloride to Ni(0). The Ni(II) benzyl complex is reduced to Ni(I), e.g., by zinc, which inserts CO2 delivering the nickel carboxylate. Reduction of the Ni(I) carboxylate to Ni(0) releases the zinc carboxylate (Scheme 6). Similarly, such carboxylation has been achieved on aryl and benzyl pivalate, alkyl halides, and allyl esters.

References

Coordination complexes
Inorganic chemistry
Organometallic chemistry
Transition metals